The 1986 Highland Regional Council election to the Highland Regional Council was held on 8 May 1986 as part of the wider 1986 Scottish regional elections. The election saw Independents win control of 36 of the council's 52 seats.

Turnout was 42.1% in contested electoral districts. Only half of the regions electoral districts were contested.

Aggregate results

Ward results

References

1986 Scottish local elections
1986